Alice Maud Gowenlock was an English badminton player. Born in Lambeth in 1878 she was a prominent player before the First World War and a member of the Richmond BC. She won two All England titles. and played for England just once against Ireland in 1911-12. She died in 1957 at the age of 80 in Worthing, Sussex.

Medal Record at the All England Badminton Championships

References

English female badminton players
1878 births
1957 deaths